Maraj, Maharaj, Maharajh, Maragh, or Maharagh is a Hindu Indian surname derived from the Sanskrit word Maharaja meaning "great leader", "great ruler", or "great king". Originally used as an honorific suffix to a Hindu priest's name, it became the surname of many Hindu priests who immigrated to different European colonies during the Indian indenture system and their descendants because when stating their names to the respective local colonial authorities they would state their whole name and many would include the honorific suffix of Maharaj, which the authorities  erroneously documented as their surname. Notable individuals bearing the surname include:

Badri Maharaj, an Indo-Fijian politician
 Bhadase Sagan Maraj (1919–1971), an Indo-Trinidadian politician, Hindu religious leader, founder of the Sanatan Dharma Maha Sabha, wrestler, author, and businessman
Davan Maharaj, an Indo-Trinidadian American journalist and former editor-in-chief and publisher of the Los Angeles Times
Devant Maharaj, an Indo-Trinidadian politician 
 Ishwar Maraj (b. 1969), an Indo-Trinidadian member of the St Lucia cricket team
Keshav Maharaj (b. 1990), an Indo-South African cricketer
Krishna Maharaj (b. 1939), a British Indo-Trinidadian businessman convicted of murder in South Florida
Onika Maraj (b. 1982), a Trinidadian-born American rapper known professionally as Nicki Minaj
Rabi Maharaj (b. 1947), a Trinidadian bestselling author 
Rajiv Maragh (b.1985), an Indo-Jamaican jockey
 Ralph Maraj (b. 1949), an Indo-Trinidadian politician, actor, playwright, and teacher
Ramesh Maharaj, an Indo-Trinidadian politician and former Attorney General and Minister of Legal Affairs of Trinidad and Tobago
Sadanand Maharaj, an Indo-Fijian politician (1876-1962)
Satnarayan Maharaj (1931–2019), an Indo-Trinidadian Hindu religious leader, son-in-law of Bhadase Sagan Maraj, and Secretary-General of the Sanatan Dharma Maha Sabha
Sathyandranath Ragunanan "Mac" Maharaj, (b. 1935) in Newcastle, Natal), a South African politician, academic and businessman.
Valene Maharaj (b. 1986), an Indo-Trinidadian model, beauty pageant holder, former Miss Trinidad and Tobago, and former Miss Caribbean of the World

See also
Persaud
Rampersad
Gobin

References

Indian surnames
Surnames of Indian origin
Hindustani-language surnames
Hindu surnames
Indo-Caribbean
Indian diaspora in Fiji
Indian diaspora in South Africa